The 2008 Sultan Qaboos Cup was the 36th edition of the Sultan Qaboos Cup, the premier knockout tournament for football teams in Oman.

The competition began on 26 August 2008 with the Group Stage and concluded on 15 December 2008. Sur SC were the defending champions, having won their third title in 2007. On Monday 15 December 2008, Al-Suwaiq Club were crowned the champions of the 2008 Sultan Qaboos Cup when they defeated Al-Nahda Club 1–0, hence winning the title for the first time.

Teams
This year the tournament had 27 teams. The winners qualified for the 2009 AFC Cup.
 Ahli Sidab Club (Sidab)
 Al-Bashaer Club 
 Al-Khaboora SC (Al-Khaboora)
 Al-Musannah SC (Al-Musannah)
 Al-Nahda Club (Al-Buraimi)
 Al-Nasr S.C.S.C. (Salalah)
 Al-Oruba SC (Sur)
 Al-Rustaq SC (Rustaq)
 Al-Salam SC (Sohar)
 Al-Seeb Club (Seeb)
 Al-Shabab Club (Seeb)
 Al-Suwaiq Club (Suwaiq
 Al-Tali'aa SC (Sur)
 Bahla Club (Bahla)
 Dhofar S.C.S.C. (Salalah)
 Fanja SC (Fanja)
 Ja'lan SC (Jalan Bani Bu Ali)
 Majees SC (Majees)
 Mirbat SC (Mirbat)
 Muscat Club (Muscat)
 Nizwa Club (Nizwa)
 Oman Club (Muscat)
 Quriyat Club (Quriyat)
 Saham SC (Saham)
 Salalah SC (Salalah)
 Sohar SC (Sohar)
 Sur SC (Sur)

Group stage

Group A

Group B

Group C

Group D

Group Stage Results
The first match played was between Al-Tali'aa SC and Nizwa Club on 26 August 2008. 8 teams advanced to the Round of 16 and joined the other 8 teams who were pre-qualified.

Round of 16
16 teams played a knockout tie. 8 ties were played over two legs. The first match was played between Ja'lan SC and Muscat Club on 5 October 2008. 8 teams advanced to the quarterfinals.

1st Legs

2nd Legs

Quarterfinals
8 teams played a knockout tie. 4 ties were played over two legs. The first match was played between Al-Nasr S.C.S.C. and Al-Tali'aa SC on 30 October 2008. Al-Tali'aa SC, Al-Oruba SC, Al-Nahda Club and Al-Suwaiq Club qualified for the semifinals.

1st Legs

2nd Legs

Semifinals
4 teams played a knockout tie. 2 ties were played over two legs. The first match was played between Al-Nahda Club and Al-Oruba SC on 24 November 2008. Al-Nahda Club and Al-Suwaiq Club qualified for the finals.

1st Legs

2nd Legs

Finals

References

External links
Oman Sultan Cup 2008-2009 at Goalzz.com

Sultan Qaboos Cup seasons
Cup